The Ellenburger Group is a geologic group in Texas. It preserves fossils dating back to the Ordovician period.

See also

 List of fossiliferous stratigraphic units in Texas
 Paleontology in Texas

References
 

Geologic groups of Texas
Ordovician System of North America